Avan-Arinj, is a neighbourhood in the Avan District of Yerevan, Armenia.

References 

Populated places in Yerevan